"Erlkönig" is a poem by Johann Wolfgang von Goethe. It depicts the death of a child assailed by a supernatural being, the Erlking, a king of the fairies. It was originally written by Goethe as part of a 1782 Singspiel, .

"Erlkönig" has been called Goethe's "most famous ballad". The poem has been set to music by several composers, most notably by Franz Schubert.

Summary 
An anxious young boy is being carried at night by his father on horseback. To where is not spelled out; German Hof has a rather broad meaning of "yard", "courtyard", "farm", or (royal) "court". The opening line tells that the time is unusually late and the weather unusually inclement for travel. As it becomes apparent that the boy is delirious, a possibility is that the father is rushing him to medical aid.

As the poem unfolds, the son claims to see and hear the "Erlkönig" (Erl-King). His father claims to not see or hear the creature, and he attempts to comfort his son, asserting natural explanations for what the child sees – a wisp of fog, rustling leaves, shimmering willows.

The Erl-King attempts to lure the child into joining him, promising amusement, rich clothes and the attentions of his daughters. Finally, the Erl-King declares that he will take the child by force. Upon reaching the destination, the child is already dead.

Text

The legend 
Goethe's poem then took on a life of its own, inspiring the Romantic concept of the Erlking.

 In the original Scandinavian version of the tale, the antagonist was the Erlkönig's daughter rather than the Erlkönig himself.

Settings to music 
The poem has often been set to music, with Franz Schubert's rendition, his Opus 1 (D. 328), being the best known. Probably the next best known is that of Carl Loewe (1818). Other notable settings are by members of Goethe's circle, including the actress Corona Schröter (1782), Andreas Romberg (1793), Johann Friedrich Reichardt (1794) and Carl Friedrich Zelter (1797). Ludwig van Beethoven attempted to set it to music but abandoned the effort; his sketch however was full enough to be published in a completion by Reinhold Becker (1897). A few other 19th-century versions are those by Václav Tomášek (1815) and Louis Spohr (1856, with obbligato violin; Op. 154 No. 4) and Heinrich Wilhelm Ernst (Polyphonic Studies for Solo Violin), though his was essentially a transcription of Schubert's version for solo violin. Twenty-first-century examples are the pianist Marc-André Hamelin's "Etude No. 8 (after Goethe)" for solo piano, based on "Erlkönig".

Franz Schubert composition 

Franz Schubert composed his Lied "Erlkönig" for solo voice and piano at the age of 17 or 18 in 1815, setting text from Goethe's poem. The work was first performed in concert on 1 December 1820 at a private gathering in Vienna. The public premiere on 7 March 1821 at the Theater am Kärntnertor was a great success, and he quickly rose to fame among the composers in Vienna. It is one of Schubert's most famous works, with enduring popularity and acclaim since its premiere in 1821.

Carl Loewe composition 
Carl Loewe's setting was published as Op. 1, No. 3 and composed in 1817–18, in the lifetime of the poem's author and also of Schubert, whose version Loewe did not then know. Collected with it were Op. 1, No. 1, "Edward" (1818; a translation of the Scottish ballad), and No. 2, "" (1823; "The Innkeeper's Daughter"), a poem of Ludwig Uhland. Inspired by a German translation of Scottish border ballads, Loewe set several poems with an elvish theme; but although all three of Op. 1 are concerned with untimely death, in this set only the "Erlkönig" has the supernatural element.

Loewe's accompaniment is in semiquaver groups of six in  time and marked  (fast). The vocal line evokes the galloping effect by repeated figures of crotchet and quaver, or sometimes three quavers, overlying the binary tremolo of the semiquavers in the piano. In addition to an unusual sense of motion, this creates a flexible template for the stresses in the words to fall correctly within the rhythmic structure.

Loewe's version is less melodic than Schubert's, with an insistent, repetitive harmonic structure between the opening minor key and answering phrases in the major key of the dominant, which have a stark quality owing to their unusual relationship to the home key. The narrator's phrases are echoed by the voices of father and son, the father taking up the deeper, rising phrase, and the son a lightly undulating, answering theme around the dominant fifth. These two themes also evoke the rising and moaning of the wind.

The Erl-King, who is always heard pianissimo, does not sing melodies, but instead delivers insubstantial rising arpeggios that outline a single major chord (that of the home key) which sounds simultaneously on the piano in una corda tremolo. Only with his final threatening word, "Gewalt", does he depart from this chord. Loewe's implication is that the Erlking has no substance but merely exists in the child's feverish imagination. As the piece progresses, the first in the groups of three quavers is dotted to create a breathless pace, which then forms a bass figure in the piano driving through to the final crisis. The last words, leap from the lower dominant to the sharpened third of the home key; this time not to the major but to a diminished chord, which settles chromatically through the home key in the major and then to the minor.

See also 
List of works based on Erlkönig

References

Further reading

External links 

Translation by Matthew Lewis
Translation at Poems Found in Translation
, translation and performance by Josh Ritter
, orchestrated by Max Reger; Teddy Tahu Rhodes, Tasmanian Symphony Orchestra, Sebastian Lang-Lessing
 
 
Full score and MIDI file of Schubert's setting of "Erlkönig" from the Mutopia Project

Ballads
Poetry by Johann Wolfgang von Goethe
1782 poems
Musical settings of poems by Johann Wolfgang von Goethe
Poems about death
Songs about death
Songs about children
Songs about kings
Songs about fictional male characters